CFL on CBC was a presentation of Canadian Football League football aired on CBC Television. CBC held broadcast rights for the CFL from 1952 to 2007. The exclusive broadcasting rights for the league moved to TSN starting from the 2008 CFL season.

Schedule
The broadcast schedule changed several times in its history, but in the final years of the run, CBC showed a game every Saturday. CBC also showed the Labour Day Classic, a Labour Day Monday CFL Doubleheader which always featuring the Toronto Argonauts versus the Hamilton Tiger-Cats and the Edmonton Eskimos versus the Calgary Stampeders.  The CFL on CBC also showed the Thanksgiving Day Classic (Monday) doubleheader. From 1991 until 2007, the CBC had exclusive coverage of all playoff games and the Grey Cup Championship Game.

The CFL on CBC ended its run on November 25, 2007, airing the 95th Grey Cup from the Rogers Centre in Toronto, Ontario, after which the CFL left broadcast television and signed a six-year contract with cable network TSN. The CFL granted a no-bid extension to the TSN contract in 2013 (and has offered additional no-bid extensions since then), after which the CBC announced it would no longer pursue professional sports broadcasting rights of any kind.

Commentators
At the end of its run, the CFL on CBC was hosted by Elliotte Friedman, and featured the panel of Sean Millington, Greg Frers, and Khari Jones. Mark Lee and Chris Walby formed the lead broadcast team. The secondary broadcast team was Steve Armitage and Khari Jones. From August 20 – October 4, 2005, the CFL on CBC had no on-air announcers due to a CMG strike.

On-air personalities of the CFL on CBC

Play-by-play
Steve Armitage (1984–1986, 1991, 2005–2007)
Dean Brown (2000, 2004)
Don Chevrier (1969–1980)
Chris Cuthbert (1992–2004)
Dan Kelly (1964)
Mark Lee (1996–2007)
Norm Marshall (1952)
Bob Moir (1959–1961)
Bruce Rainnie (2007)
Ted Reynolds (1956–1960)
Don Wittman (1961–1997)

Colour commentary
Ernie Afaganis (1966–1969)
David Archer (1996–1997)
Leo Cahill (1981–1985)
James Curry (1993–1996)
Chuck Ealey (1986)
Terry Evanshen (1979–1980)
Darren Flutie (2002–2006)
Greg Frers (2007)
Joe Galat (1991–1993)
Russ Jackson (1971–1973, 1977–1980)
Khari Jones (2006–2007)
Dan Kepley (1991–1996)
Ron Lancaster (1981–1990)
Larry O'Brien (1962)
Ken Ploen
Frank Rigney (1969–1977)
Chris Walby (1998–2007)
Jack Wells (1954)
Nobby Wirkowski (1966)

Hosts
Steve Douglas (1953–1961)
Elliotte Friedman (2006–2007)
Dave Hodge (1984–1986)
Scott Oake (1995)
John Wells (1973–1983)
Brian Williams (1987–2005)

Studio analysts
Daved Benefield (2007)
Bernie Faloney (1962)
Darren Flutie (2002–2006)
Greg Frers (2003–2007)
Joe Galat (1993)
Khari Jones (2006–2007)
Sean Millington (2003–2004, 2006–2007)
Annis Stukus (1955)
Glen Suitor (1995–2002)
Eric Tillman (2005)
Chris Walby (1997)

Sideline reporters
Ernie Afaganis (1966–1969)
Frank Anderson (1962–1963)
Steve Armitage (1977–2007)
Ward Cornell (1959)
Mark Connolly (2007)
Chris Cuthbert (1995)
Darren Flutie (2006)
Elliotte Friedman (2005)
Brenda Irving (1996–2007)
Khari Jones (2007)
Mark Lee (2004)
Doug Maxwell (1961)
Tom McKee
Bob Moir (1958–1960)
Scott Oake (1987–1994)
Larry O'Brien (1956–1957)
Brian Williams (1984–1986)

References

Sports telecast series
Black-and-white Canadian television shows
CBC Television original programming
CBC Sports
Canadian Football League on television
1952 Canadian television series debuts
2007 Canadian television series endings
1950s Canadian sports television series
1960s Canadian sports television series
1970s Canadian sports television series
1980s Canadian sports television series
1990s Canadian sports television series
2000s Canadian sports television series